Tzang Merwyn Tong (born 31 October 1979) is an underground filmmaker and screenwriter from Singapore, best known as the producer, scriptwriter and director of the dystopian teen movie Faeryville (2015). In 2015, Faeryville made its world premiere in Los Angeles.

Tong is acclaimed for the films e'Tzaintes (2003), A Wicked Tale (2005), and V1k1 - A Techno Fairytale (2010), which has travelled to film festivals in Berlin, Montreal, Rotterdam, Munich and Australia. Tong's films are characterised by his off-beat style, often set in surreal worlds, incorporating elements of fairy tale and comic fantasy.

Tong founded his own production company INRI studio in 1999. He is the youngest Singaporean to ever release a film commercially on DVD/VCD. F*** magazine calls Tong a "maverick director", with Twitch Film hailing him as a "Singapore filmmaker standing out from the rest of the pack".

Biography
Tong made his debut film e'Tzaintes, a no-budget teenage black comedy, when he was 19 years old, with no prior knowledge in filmmaking. It tells the story of social misfits who band together to stand up against oppression. The film was made guerrilla style, under tight budget constraints, with no professional actors, but attracted international attention when it premiered at film festivals, making its European Premiere as the Opening Night Film of the Berlin Asia Pacific Film Festival.

Soon after e'Tzaintes was released, Tong embarked on his second film, A Wicked Tale, a psycho-erotic thriller based on the Little Red Riding Hood fable. The film made its World Premiere to critical acclaim at the 34th Rotterdam International Film Festival. Tickets for A Wicked Tale's World Premiere were sold out.

A Wicked Tale went on to festivals in Berlin, Munich, Frankfurt, Tel Aviv, Melbourne, Montreal, Lund, Leeds and Florida, receiving rave reviews as the sold-out Closing Night film of the Montreal FanTasia Festival. It was described by Montreal Mirror as a "hallicinatory atmospheric film drenched in lust and dread".

In 2005, Tong became the youngest Singapore director to ever release a film commercially on DVD/VCD. The copies of A Wicked Tale were sold out within a year. Bootleg copies are still circulated in underground markets, contributing to its growing cult status. Plans for a new feature film began, but it took him 7 years to raise enough money to make it. The film was code named The FRVL Project.

In 2010, Tong collaborated with a local Institute of Technical Education on a short film, a SciFi/Fantasy titled V1K1 – A Techno Fairytale. The film sees him working with a student crew from the school of Digital Audio Video Production, featuring music by Amanda Ling (formerly of Electrico). V1K1 is a homage to 70s Sci Fi movies, that favour wildly imaginative storytelling over an emphasis of special effects. The film is described as a "Techno-Fairy Riff on Shakespeare's A Midsummer Night's Dream", telling a story of a human scientist dead set on proving the existence of fairies. The film premiered at the 2nd Singapore Short Film Awards and is the winner of the Gold Remi Award in the Fantasy/Sci Fi category at the 2011 WorldFest in Houston, USA.

News that Tong was working on a feature film Faeryville surfaced in The Business Times of Singapore in August 2012. The film was previously code-named The FRVL Project. Faeryville is described as "Fight Club meets (Baz Luhrmann's) Romeo + Juliet, set in a fictitious college that mirrors our increasingly surreal world". Faeryville took Tong 8 years to complete, largely due to its controversial themes involving college shootings and youth bullying.

In 2015, Faeryville made its red carpet World Premiere to rousing reception at the Downtown Independent Theatre in Los Angeles, with the LA audiences applauding it as a 'zeitgeist film'. In April 2015, Faeryville was given a pass with an M18 rating by the Media Development Authority of Singapore to have a limited theatrical run in Singapore. Tickets to the Singapore Gala Premiere was sold out on the same day it went on sale. 
 Mothership.SG describes Faeryville as "unorthodox and inventive…flying the flag of alternative cinema in Singapore."

With Faeryville as a cultural talking point, Tong became an ambassador to raise awareness for Coalition Against Bullying for Children and Youth in Singapore.

Filmography
 Faeryville aka The FRVL Project (2015) (director / writer / producer) 
 V1K1 – A Techno Fairytale (2011) (director / writer)
 A Wicked Tale (2005) (director / writer / producer)
 e'Tzaintes (2003) (director / writer / producer)

Education
Tong graduated from Curtin University in Western Australia with a Degree in Mass Communications. He also graduated from Ngee Ann Polytechnic's School of Film and Media Studies in 1999 with a Diploma in Mass Communication.

References

External links
Official Site

Twitch Review on e'Tzaintes
Rotterdam International Film Festival write-up
FanTasia International Film Festival Program
I-S Magazine X-factor creatives that will blow your mind away
Time-Out Interview with Tzang Merwyn Tong
A Nutshell Review
Singapore film ‘Faeryville’ premieres in Hollywood to rousing reception
Taking an Alternative Route - The Business Times
SINdie interview with Faeryville Director

Living people
Singaporean people of Chinese descent
Singaporean film directors
1979 births